Parachondrostoma arrigonis is a species of cyprinid fish endemic to Spain only found in the Júcar River basin.  Its natural habitat is rivers.
It is threatened by habitat loss.

References

Parachondrostoma
Endemic fauna of Spain
Endemic fish of the Iberian Peninsula
Cyprinid fish of Europe
Fish described in 1866
Taxonomy articles created by Polbot